James Lee may refer to:

Ordered chronologically within each section.

Arts and entertainment
James Lee (screenwriter) (1923–2002), American screenwriter
James Lee (writer) (born 1947), Singaporean writer
James Lee (film director) (born 1973), Malaysian film director and producer
James Kyson Lee (born 1975), Korean-born American actor
James Lee (tenor) (born 1979), South Korean opera tenor
James Lee, vocalist for the death metal band Origin

Business
James Lee (nurseryman) (1715–1795), Scottish nurseryman, trading as Lee and Kennedy
James T. Lee (1877–1968), American lawyer, banker and real estate developer
James B. Lee, Jr. (1952–2015), investment banker
James Zhongzi Lee (born 1955), Chinese business magnate, investor and real estate developer

Sports
James Lee (cricketer, born 1838) (1838–1880), Yorkshire cricketer during the 1880s
James P. Lee (1870–1941), American football player
Tancy Lee (1882–1941), Scottish boxer born James Lee
James Lee (basketball) (born 1956), American basketball player
James Lee (defensive tackle) (1980–2016), American football player
James Lee (offensive lineman) (born 1985), American football player
James Lee (cricketer, born 1988), Yorkshire cricketer during the 2000s

Other fields
James Prince Lee (1804–1869), English clergyman who became the first Bishop of Manchester
James Paris Lee (1831–1904), British-Canadian inventor and arms designer
James H. Lee (1840–1877), American sailor and Medal of Honor recipient
James Yimm Lee (1920–1972), martial arts author 
James Madison Lee (1926–2017), U.S. Army general
James Lee (Canadian politician) (born 1937), Prince Edward Island politician
James Jay Lee, perpetrator in the 2010 Discovery Communications headquarters hostage crisis

See also

James Lee House (disambiguation)
Jim Lee (disambiguation)
Jimmy Lee (disambiguation)
James Leigh (disambiguation)